Bamford railway station serves the village of Bamford in the Derbyshire Peak District, in England and is managed by Northern Trains.

History

Bamford station was built by the Dore and Chinley Railway, a company which was absorbed by the Midland Railway prior to opening. The line was opened for goods traffic on 6 November 1893, and for passenger trains on 1 June 1894, but Bamford station was not opened until 25 June that year. 

The Dore and Chinley line later became known as the Hope Valley Line. The station became an unstaffed halt in 1969 when the last station master purchased the Station House. The main station building was located on the road overbridge, and was removed during the late 1970s.

Facilities
The station is unstaffed as noted, but Northern has installed ticket vending machines here to allow intending travellers to buy tickets before boarding. Standard waiting shelters are provided on each platform, whilst train running details are offered via help points, automatic announcements and timetable posters. Step-free access is available to both platforms (the eastbound one via a ramp from Station Road).

Service
All services are provided by Northern Trains except the first (to Liverpool Lime Street) and the last (to Nottingham) which are provided by East Midlands Railway.

Trains from Sheffield take around 22 minutes, and trains from Manchester Piccadilly take around 53 minutes.

The typical off-peak service from the station includes a train in each direction (west to  via  and east to ) hourly - with minor exceptions. The same also operates on Bank Holidays. On weekends, there is one train in each direction, each hour.

References

External links

Railway stations in Derbyshire
DfT Category F2 stations
Former Midland Railway stations
Railway stations in Great Britain opened in 1894
Railway stations served by East Midlands Railway
Northern franchise railway stations